Muhammad Bashir can refer to:

 Muhammad Bashir (1935–2001), Pakistani wrestler
 Muhammad Bashir (swimmer) (born 1935), Pakistani swimmer
 Muhammad Bashir (weightlifter) (born 1930), Pakistani weightlifter
 Muhammad Ahmed Bashir (born 1949), Pakistani hurdler